Arnon Tamir (born March 14, 1986) is an Israeli footballer who plays for F.C. Shikun HaMizrah.

References

External links
 

1986 births
Living people
Israeli footballers
Hapoel Marmorek F.C. players
Maccabi Ironi Bat Yam F.C. players
Beitar Tel Aviv Bat Yam F.C. players
Sektzia Ness Ziona F.C. players
Maccabi Netanya F.C. players
Maccabi Yavne F.C. players
Maccabi Kiryat Gat F.C. players
F.C. Shikun HaMizrah players
Maccabi Jaffa F.C. players
Israeli Premier League players
Liga Leumit players
Association football midfielders